is a Japanese actress and tarento. She is famous for such TV dramas as Yae no Sakura, Ashita, Mama ga Inai and as a television personality.

Filmography

Television
  (Fuji TV, 2012) – Minagawa Riko 
 Yae's Sakura (NHK, 2013) – Yamamoto Yae  (child)
 Woman (NTV, 3 July–11 September 2013) – Aoyagi Nozomi  (Koharu's daughter)
  (23 September, Fuji TV) – Masaki Tamao 
  (29 September 2014)
  (Fuji TV) – Satomi Yumika  (episode 1, 8 October 2013)
 Ashita, Mama ga Inai (NTV, 2014) – Maki, nicknamed "Donki"
  (TBS) – Hanamura Miyuki  (episode 5, 13 May 2014)
  (MBS, 5 October 2014) – Kirihara Mai 
  (NTV, January – March 2015) – Shizukuishi Miko  (starring role)
 37.5°C no Namida (TBS, July – September 2015) - Asahina Koharu 
 Asa ga Kita (NHK, 2015) - Asa (child) and Chiyo (child)
 Never Let Me Go (TBS, 2016) - Hoshina Kyoko  (child)
 Zenryoku Shissō (NHK, 2018) - Isoyama Nanami

Films
  (26 March 2013, Shochiku）
  (10 January 2015, Toho) – Dōjima Tsubaki 
  (19 March 2016, Warner Entertainment Japan) – Hinazuki Kayo 
 Miracles of the Namiya General Store (2017) – young Seri
  (2018）

Animated films
 Modest Heroes (2018) – Kanino

Anime television
Dororo (2019) – Dororo
Yu-Gi-Oh! Sevens (2020) - Mimi Atachi
Yu-Gi-Oh! Go Rush!! (2022) - Manya Atachi

Japanese dubbing
Live-action
 World War Z (2013) – Lane Rachel  (Gerry's older daughter)
 Logan (2017) – Laura / X-23 (Dafne Keen)
 The Worst Witch (2017) – Mildred Hubble
 Home Alone 3 (2019 NTV edition) – Molly Pruitt (Scarlett Johansson)
Animation
 The Little Prince (November 2015) – girl

Bibliography
  (23 September 2014, Wani Books)

Discography

Singles

References

External links
  
 

2005 births
Living people
Actors from Saitama Prefecture
Japanese child actresses
Japanese film actresses
Japanese television actresses
Japanese television personalities
Japanese voice actresses
21st-century Japanese actresses